Fat: The Fight of My Life is a television series where obese people lose weight. Each episode follows a year in the life of an obese person trying to lose weight. Trained by host Jessie Pavelka. It was originally aired in the United Kingdom.

episode 1 - Bejamin

episode 2 - Jeni

episode 3 - Darren

episode 4 - Alison

episode 5 - David

episode 6 - John

episode 7 - Sarah

episode 8 - Leanne

References

External links
 

2013 British television series debuts
2013 British television series endings
2010s British reality television series
Sky UK original programming
Weight loss
English-language television shows